Club Deportivo Armenio is a football club from Ingeniero Maschwitz, Greater Buenos Aires, Argentina. The team currently plays in the Primera B Metropolitana, which is the regionalised third division of the Argentine football league system.

History

The club was founded in 1962 under the name Club Armenio de Fútbol by the Armenian community in Argentina. It changed its name in 1968, and was affiliated to the Argentine Football Association two years later. The original colours were black and white, but first changed to green and white stripes and then again to red and white. Nowadays, home uniform is red, orange and blue, inspired by the flag of Armenia.

The first official title won by Armenio was the 1972 Primera D championship, therefore promoting to the upper division, Primera C. Only four years later, the squad won another championship and promoted to Primera B.

In the 1986–87 season of the Primera B Nacional (second division), Deportivo Armenio broke the division's record of most matches without losing, with a run of 38 games without defeat. The team's coach at that time was Alberto Parseghian (former goalkeeper of the team and of other Argentine clubs), and the captain was Miguel Gardarian. Following this successful run, the club gained promotion to the Primera División (first division). Their highest ever finish in the top division was 13th in the 1987–88 season, followed by relegation the season after (the 1988–89).

A notable game in the club's history was a 3–2 away win against River Plate in the 1987–88 season, after being 0–2 down. On that day, the 3 goals were scored by Raúl Wensel. Another important victory was in the same season against Boca Juniors, in La Bombonera. Armenio won that day 1–0 with a goal scored by Silvano Maciel. This match was the last one in Hugo Gatti's (Boca's goalkeeper) career, as the team's coach (José Omar Pastoriza) took him out of the starting lineup for his mistake in Maciel's goal.

Current squad

Titles
Primera B Nacional (1): 1986–87

Runner-up: Banfield

Primera C (1): 1976

Runner-up: Argentino de Quilmes

Primera D (1): 1972

Runner-up: Liniers

References

External links
Official website

 
Armenian Argentine
Association football clubs established in 1962
1962 establishments in Argentina
Football clubs in Buenos Aires Province
Armenian association football clubs outside Armenia